This list of conflicts in the Philippines is a timeline of events that includes pre-colonial wars, Spanish–Moro conflict, Philippine revolts against Spain, battles, skirmishes, and other related items that have occurred in the Philippines' geographical area.

List

Gallery

See also
 Military history of the Philippines
 Warfare in pre-colonial Philippines
 List of wars involving the Philippines
Battles of the Philippines

References
Notes

Bibliography

, Translated by Paula Carolina S. Malay

 

 

 

 

 (English translation by Sulpicio Guevara)

 

 

, Translated by Leon Ma. Guerrero.

 

 

 

 

 .

External links
Wars of the Philippines

Military history of the Philippines
Conflicts